Haroldo Rodrigues Magalhães Castro (born 20 December 1931), known as Haroldo, is a Brazilian footballer. He played in two matches for the Brazil national football team in 1953. He was also part of Brazil's squad for the 1953 South American Championship.

References

External links
 

1931 births
Living people
Brazilian footballers
Brazil international footballers
Place of birth missing (living people)
Association footballers not categorized by position